London Buses route 36 is a Transport for London contracted bus route in London, England. Running between New Cross Gate and Queen's Park, it is operated by London Central.

History

Route 36 dates back to 1911 when London General Omnibus Company commenced operating between Queens Park and Victoria. By 1934 it had been extended to Hither Green.

On 24 August 1961, a gun and five boxes of ammunition were found under the rear seat of a 36A bus in Peckham garage. The gun was identified as that used to kill Michael Gregsten and wound Valerie Storie in the 'A6 murder case', for which James Hanratty was hanged.

The 36B was cut back to Peckham and renumbered route 136 in March 1994.

On 29 January 2005, route 36 was converted to one man operation with the AEC Routemasters replaced by Plaxton President bodied Volvo B7TLs.

Present day
It is one of very few routes still to cross central London, carrying people in to the centre from both ends of the route.

On 9 February 2013, London Central retained the contract for route 36 with new and existing Alexander Dennis Enviro400s. It is operated out of New Cross garage.

Current route
Route 36 operates via these primary locations:
New Cross bus garage
Queens Road Peckham station  
Peckham High Street
Camberwell Green
Kennington Park
Kennington for Oval station 
Kennington Oval
Vauxhall bus station  for Vauxhall station  
Vauxhall Bridge
Bessborough Gardens  for Pimlico station 
Victoria bus station  for Victoria station  
Hyde Park Corner station 
Marble Arch station 
St Mary's Hospital
Paddington station   
Royal Oak station 
Maida Hill
Queen's Park station

References

External links

Timetable Transport for London

Bus routes in London
Transport in the London Borough of Brent
Transport in the London Borough of Camden
Transport in the London Borough of Lambeth
Transport in the London Borough of Lewisham
Transport in the London Borough of Southwark